was a railway station on the Towada Kankō Electric Railway Line located in the town of Rokunohe, Kamikita District, Aomori Prefecture, Japan. It was 5.1 kilometers from the terminus of the Towada Kankō Electric Railway Line at Misawa Station.

History
Yanagisawa Station was opened on December 1, 1932.

The station was closed when the Towada Kankō Electric Railway Line was discontinued on April 1, 2012.

Lines
Towada Kankō Electric Railway
Towada Kankō Electric Railway Line

Station layout
Yanagisawa Station had a single side platforms serving a single track. There was a small rain shelter on the platform but no station building. The station was surrounded by farmland with no houses or shops in the vicinity.

Platforms

Adjacent stations

See also
 List of railway stations in Japan

References

External links
Totetsu home page 
location map

Railway stations in Japan opened in 1932
Railway stations in Aomori Prefecture
Railway stations closed in 2012
Defunct railway stations in Japan
2012 disestablishments in Japan